Choanomphalus maacki is a species of freshwater air-breathing snail, an aquatic pulmonate gastropod mollusk in the family Planorbidae, the ram's horn snails, or planorbids.

Choanomphalus maacki is the type species of the genus Choanomphalus.

Subspecies 
 Choanomphalus maacki maacki Gerstfeldt, 1859
 Choanomphalus maacki andrussowianus (Lindholm, 1909)
 Choanomphalus maacki elatior Lindholm, 1909

However, IUCN Red List 2013 lists these three as synonyms.

Distribution 
This species is found in Lake Baikal, Russia. Its natural habitats are freshwater lakes and river mouths.

Description
The width of the shell is 5–6 mm. The height of the shell is 2.5–3.0 mm.

References

External links

Planorbidae
Gastropods described in 1859